Psilorhynchus breviminor is a freshwater ray-finned fish, a torrent minnow, in the genus Psilorhynchus. It is only known from the Ma Gawe River, close to the Kalaw-Thazi highway, near the state border between Mandalay and Shan near the village of Nampantet in Myanmar. It was collected from algal mats, where it seemed to be either resting or feedingin a cool, fast-flowing stream which had a bed made up of sand and gravel and a depth of 30 cm.

References 

breviminor
Taxa named by Kevin W. Conway
Taxa named by Richard L. Mayden
Fish described in 2008